Jason Plummer (born June 4, 1982) is an American businessman and politician serving as a Republican member of the Illinois Senate and serves as Assistant Leader in the Illinois Republican Senate Caucus. Plummer represents the 54th District, which is located on the Illinois side of Greater St. Louis and includes all or portions of Bond, Clinton, Effingham, Fayette, Madison, Marion, Washington, and St. Clair counties.

As of November 26, 2022, Jason Plummer is a member of the Illinois Republican State Central Committee representing Republicans residing in Illinois's 15th congressional district.

Early life, education, and military service 
Plummer's family resided in Staunton, Illinois at his birth and moved to Glen Carbon, Illinois. Plummer lived in Glen Carbon and Edwardsville, Illinois, where he graduated from Edwardsville High School, before attending and graduating from the University of Illinois Urbana-Champaign with a B.S. in Finance. At the University of Illinois, Plummer was active in several organizations including the Army ROTC Fighting Illini Battalion. After college, he interned at The Heritage Foundation in Washington, DC. He commissioned as an Intelligence Officer in the United States Navy Reserves after college.

Political involvement 
At age 25, Plummer was elected Chairman of the Madison County Republican Party, the minority party in a historic stronghold for the Democratic Party of Illinois. The youngest party chairman in Illinois at the time, he was elected on a platform of combating local corruption and rebuilding the local GOP in one of the largest counties in the state by population. Since Plummer's election, the Madison County Republican Party has made significant gains, winning numerous county-wide offices and taking majority control of the county board for the first time in history.

During the 2008 Republican Party presidential primaries, Plummer ran to be a delegate to the 2008 Republican National Convention from Illinois's 19th congressional district for the presidential campaign of former Governor Mitt Romney.

Plummer was the Republican nominee for Lieutenant Governor of Illinois in 2010. Plummer won the primary and was paired with the winner of the Republican gubernatorial primary, State Senator Bill Brady, for the general election. The Brady/Plummer ticket narrowly lost to incumbent Illinois Governor Pat Quinn in the 2010 gubernatorial election. Plummer was the campaign's voice on economic issues in an election heavily centered on the economy and government corruption issues.

Election to the Illinois State Senate 
Plummer was first elected to the Illinois Senate in 2018. He defeated three others in the primary election, garnering over 57% of the total vote in the four-way race. In the general election he carried all eight counties of the district and defeated his opponent with over 70% of the vote, becoming the first Republican State Senator from Madison County in five decades.

102nd Illinois General Assembly 
In January 2021, Plummer was named Assistant Republican Leader on the Illinois Senate Republican Leadership Team for the 102nd Illinois General Assembly. Plummer was one of the youngest senators ever appointed to leadership and is the only senator from Southern Illinois serving in Senate leadership during the 102nd Illinois General Assembly.

During the 102nd Illinois General Assembly (2021-2023), Plummer serves on the following committees: Executive Appointments (Minority Spokesperson); Financial Institutions (Minority Spokesperson); Behavioral and Mental Health; Commerce; Environment and Conservation; Health; Labor; Subcommittee on Children & Family; Sub. on Managed Care Organizations; Redistricting; Redistricting- South Cook County; Redistricting- Southern Illinois (Sub-Minority Spokesperson); Redistricting- Southwestern IL (Sub-Minority Spokesperson).

101st Illinois General Assembly 
During the 101st Illinois General Assembly (2019-2021), Plummer served on the following committees: Appropriations I, Appropriations II, Committee of the Whole, Environment and Conservation, Executive Appointments, Financial Institutions, and Public Health.

In January 2021, Plummer was an outspoken critic of Illinois House Bill 3653, appearing on Chicago TV and in print to try to defeat the bill he claimed would endanger Illinois families and communities. Though opposed by Plummer, numerous other legislators, the law enforcement community, and other groups, the controversial bill passed the Illinois Senate and the Illinois House, garnering the minimum number of votes needed to pass.

In April 2020, Plummer called on the federal government to not "bail out" Illinois, calling it the "most corrupt" state in the country while highlighting investigations and convictions of lawmakers in the state. “Don't let it happen. Federal dollars should not prop up Illinois’ failed system,” he added. His comments came after it became public that the Illinois Senate Democrat Caucus had sent a letter to Washington, DC lawmakers requesting over $41 Billion in federal funds for Illinois. “The message from Illinois’ elected leaders is crystal clear: no humility, no regrets, no acknowledgment of failures, and no strings attached. American Taxpayers — bail us out!” Plummer wrote in an op-ed, adding “Why should the fiscally prudent people of Wyoming, Missouri or elsewhere be responsible for the failed policies of Illinois?”. His op-ed appeared in national media and Plummer discussed the issue on Fox News Channel.

In December 2019, Plummer clashed with then Republican Caucus Leader, and Plummer's former 2010 running mate, Senator Bill Brady, over ethics issues. In the fall of 2019, the Illinois House and Senate established a new ethics committee to study and recommend tougher ethical laws that might prevent abuses of power, corruption, or inside dealing within the legislature. Plummer, who originally sought a position on the committee, received an appointment that he then declined to accept. Communications traded between Brady and Plummer eventually came out that showed Plummer refused the appointment because he claimed Brady offered him the appointment to the commission on the condition that Plummer would not file legislation to ban lawmakers' ability to profit on gambling, a bill supported by other senators but that would have impacted Brady personally. According to media reports that later came out, Plummer had been openly pressuring Brady to pursue more stringent ethical reforms in private Senate Republican meetings, but the Minority Leader instead opted to embrace "low-hanging fruit” offered by Democrats. Plummer, a first term senator at the time, received favorable commentary from other legislators and the media for his actions and subsequently filed a package of bills on topics relating to legislators' involvement in gambling and recreational marijuana investments, pay-to-play and lobbying activities, campaign spending activities, and other ethics-related topics.

On the issue of taxes, Plummer supports lowering the state income tax. In early 2019, he cosponsored a proposal (Senate Joint Resolution Constitutional Amendment 12) which would call for a new amendment to the Illinois state constitution that would require a two-thirds supermajority in both houses of the legislature for any measure that raises taxes or state fees.

In 2019, Plummer sponsored legislation (HB 2308) that allowed courts to forbid contact between defendants in custody and victims. The legislation passed the legislature and was signed into law by Governor J.B. Pritzker in July 2019. Both the Illinois Sheriffs Association and Illinois Association of Chiefs of Police backed the bill. Related legislation (HB 2309) also sponsored by Plummer and signed into law enacted new rules relating to emergency stalking no contact orders, civil no contact orders, and emergency orders of protection whereby the orders do not become publicly availably information until they have been served on the respondent. Another bill sponsored by Plummer, HB 3462, allows Illinois schools to include hunting safety classes as part of the curriculum. Plummer cited expanded hunting safety as one of his chief concerns when sponsoring the bill. The legislation was signed into law and became effective immediately.

Plummer sponsored two resolutions in the 101st Illinois General Assembly, one, SR 0451, addressed economic development in downstate Illinois and passed in the Senate and the House and another, SJR 0026, which passed the Senate 55-0 but failed to be brought to a vote in the Illinois House of Representatives. SJR 0026 would have rescinded Illinois' 1862 ratification of the Corwin Amendment to the United States Constitution, which aimed to end the American Civil War by preventing federal interference in the institution of slavery. Plummer worked with several historians to address this complicated topic and sought and received support from numerous members of the Illinois Legislative Black Caucus.

During the 101st Illinois General Assembly Plummer sponsored multiple bills focused on corruption and ethics, government budgets, taxes and job creation, and enhanced criminal penalties for crimes relating to human trafficking, attacks on law enforcement personnel, drug production and distribution, and animal cruelty.

Bills sponsored by Plummer that were signed into law include bills relating to: enhanced protections for the developmentally disabled, prioritized funding for educators in rural and economically disadvantaged school districts, establishing a system to regularly investigate and review the necessity of new state regulations over previously unregulated professions or occupations, creating an electronic process involving audio and video transmission by which law enforcement may receive a search warrant from a judge, eliminating the statute of limitations on aggravated child pornography and criminal sexual abuse, creating a process by which the victim of a crime may confidentially register and provide statements to the Prison Review Board for parole and clemency hearings, lessening regulations and licensing fees on certain agricultural equipment, training requirements for charter school board members, increasing penalties on those who cause great bodily harm while driving and using an electronic communication device, forcing certain insurance policy plans to provide certain coverages for tick-borne diseases, amending the Environmental Protection Act to allow uncontaminated plastics that are returned to the economic mainstream via other forms to be considered recycled and not waste, the creation of the Veterans' Service-Related Ailments Task Force to review and make recommendations regarding veterans' service-related ailments, amending the vehicle code to ease certain restrictions and rules on volunteer fire departments, ease certain restrictions on the automotive and recycling industries, a re-write of the Uniform Code of Military Justice in Illinois to better conform with the federal UCMJ, the approval of a license plate from the Illinois Secretary of State intended to honor Illinois residents who served in the military during the Cold War, multiple bills and resolutions honoring individuals and landmarks, and banning the posting of private communications which include compromising images of a person online, including a process to force the take down of such images and to hold a person who posts such images liable for damages to the victim.

Business career 
Plummer serves as vice president of R.P. Lumber, one of the largest family-owned hardware, home center, and building material companies in the U.S. The company was founded by Plummer's parents, Robert and Donna, former school teachers and coaches, in 1977 and grew from one retail location to 75 locations across Illinois, Missouri, Wyoming, and Iowa. In 2017, the North American Retail Hardware Association selected Plummer from an international pool of candidates to be named the Young Retailer of the Year.

Plummer is a partner and senior adviser at Cimbria Capital, a private equity firm focused on water-related issues and headquartered in Houston, TX, and also serves as a director at Cimbria Invest, LLC. Plummer is actively involved in managing private equity and venture capital investments spanning multiple industries. He is a board member of APX10 a Danish SaaS company focused on the water industry. Plummer's family is a minority investor in the Los Angeles Dodgers professional baseball team.

Plummer also is involved in the development, ownership, and management of a large portfolio of residential, retail, office, light industrial, agricultural, and hotel properties across ten states. Previously the company had been involved in the development and operation of self-storage facilities and multi-family communities.

Plummer was on the board of TheBANK of Edwardsville. He also served on the board of directors for several businesses and non-profit organizations. He serves on the board of the Illinois Lumber and Material Dealers Association.

Personal life 
Plummer has two sisters, Julie and Jennifer. He and his wife, Shannon, reside in Edwardsville with their daughter. They are active supporters of various civic and charitable organizations. Plummer is Baptist and previously served on the board of the Baptist Children's Home and Family Services. The Plummer Family Park in Edwardsville, IL, a $17.2 million 83 acre sports park, was named after the family due to financial and land donations to the city's parks department.

References

External links
Senator Jason Plummer (R) 54th District at the Illinois General Assembly

1982 births
Living people
21st-century American politicians
Republican Party Illinois state senators
People from Edwardsville, Illinois
People from Staunton, Illinois
Businesspeople from Illinois
Gies College of Business alumni
Military personnel from Illinois